The Sony Vaio SVT series was a series of tablet PCs that Sony Corporation sold during 2013 till the selling of their PC business to Japan Industrial Partners.

Models

References

SVT
Computer-related introductions in 2013